Greatest Hits! of Tatsuro Yamashita is the first greatest hits album by Japanese singer-songwriter Tatsuro Yamashita, released in July 1982.

Overview
The album consists of Yamashita's songs mostly included on his previous six albums ranging from Circus Town to For You. The only song not included in any album is Amaku Kiken na Kaori which is only released as a single and a re-recording of Funky Flushin'. According to Yamashita, "Greatest Hits" is just a mundane joke that I thought of as a western music lover. The original album release (RAL-8803) included Yamashita's biography, discography, and various photographs in the form of a booklet.

Lawsuit
In 1990, BMG Victor told Yamashita of its plans to release the album, and it asked Smile to provide technical help for the project. Smile agreed, and in September 1990 the album was released (BVCR-2505) with the phrase "the only album authorized by Tatsuro Yamashita" displayed on the "obi strip". It was not until February 1991 that when Yamashita received a fan letter complaining that some songs of the album's 12 tracks were different from the previous versions. Claiming the record company had engaged in false advertising, Yamashita and his production company hired attorney Atsushi Naito, and in February 1991 they sent BMG Victor a cease and desist letter.

Changes in this release are:
Amaku Kiken na Kaori was taken from the 1984 compilation album Come Along II and DJ Katsuya Kobayashi can be heard in the intro.
Ride on Time was replaced from the single version to the album version.
Funky Flushin' was taken from the studio album Moonglow.
Bomber uses the sound taken from the 1980 compilation album Come Along and DJ Katsuya Kobayashi can once again be heard in the intro
Solid Slider was replaced from the 3 min. version to the 7 min. version from Spacy
Interlude B Part II from For You is included at the beginning before Your Eyes.

A settlement was made in 1995 and it was once collected from the store. All of those edits were fixed in the 1997 issue of the album (BVCR-1541) along with three bonus tracks.

Track listing

Personnel

Loveland, Island
Tatsuro Yamashita – Electric Guitar (Right) & Background Vocals
Jun Aoyama – Drums
Koki Ito – Bass
Kazuo Shiina – Electric Guitar (Left)
Hiroyuki Namba – Keyboards
Hidefumi Toki – Alto Sax (Solo)
Motoya Hamaguchi – Percussion
Keiko Yamakawa – Harp
From the 1982 album "For You"

愛を描いて –Let's Kiss The Sun–
Tatsuro Yamashita – Electric Guitar (Right), Percussion & Background Vocals
Yutaka Uehara – Drums
Akihiro Tanaka – Bass
Kazuo Shiina – Electric Guitar (Left)
Hiroyuki Namba – Keyboards
Minako Yoshida – Background Vocals
Kazumi Takeda – Trumpet
Shigeharu Mukai – Trombone
Tadanori Konakawa – Trombone
Takeru Muraoka – Tenor Sax
Shunzo Sunahara – Baritone Sax
From the 1979 album "Moonglow", also released as a single.

Amaku Kiken na Kaori
Tatsuro Yamashita – Electric Guitar (Left), Acoustic Piano (Solo) & Percussion
Jun Aoyama – Drums
Koki Ito – Bass
Tsunehide Matsuki – Electric Guitar (Right)
Hiroyuki Namba – Keyboards
Motoya Hamaguchi – Percussion
Shin Kazuhara – Trumpet
Masahiro Kobayashi – Trumpet
Shigeharu Mukai – Trombone
Tadanori Konakawa – Trombone
Takeru Muraoka – Tenor Sax
Shunzo Sunahara – Baritone Sax
Tadaaki Ohno – Strings Concert Master
Koji Hajima – Conductor
Strings arranged by Masahide Sakuma
Released only as a single.

Ride on Time
Tatsuro Yamashita – Electric Guitar (Right), Percussion & Background Vocals
Jun Aoyama – Drums
Koki Ito – Bass
Kazuo Shiina – Electric Guitar (Left)
Hiroyuki Namba – Keyboards
Hidefumi Toki – Alto Sax (Solo)
Minako Yoshida – Background Vocals
Shin Kazuhara – Trumpet
Yoshihiro Nakagawa – Trumpet
Shigeharu Mukai – Trombone
Tadanori Konakawa – Trombone
Takeru Muraoka – Tenor Sax
Shunzo Sunahara – Baritone Sax
From the 1980 single "Ride on Time".

The Door into Summer
Tatsuro Yamashita – Electric Guitar (Right), Clavinet, Percussion & Background Vocals
Jun Aoyama – Drums
Koki Ito – Bass
Kazuo Shiina – Electric Guitar (Left)
Hiroyuki Namba – Keyboards
Kenji Nakazawa – Flugelhorn (Solo)
Minako Yoshida – Background Vocals
From the 1980 album "Ride on Time".

Funky Flushin'
Tatsuro Yamashita – Electric Guitar & Background Vocals
Jun Aoyama – Drums
Koki Ito – Bass
Kazuo Shiina – Electric Guitar (Solo)
Hiroyuki Namba – Keyboards
Motoya Hamaguchi – Percussion (Timbales Solo)
Shin Kazuhara – Trumpet
Masahiro Kobayashi – Trumpet
Shigeharu Mukai – Trombone
Tadanori Konakawa – Trombone
Takeru Muraoka – Tenor Sax
Shunzo Sunahara – Baritone Sax
Re-recording, original mix from the album "Moonglow".

Windy Lady
Allan Schwartzberg – Drums
Will Lee – Bass
John Tropea – Electric Guitar (Right)
Jeff Mironov – Electric Guitar (Left)
Pat Rebillot – Electric Piano
Jimmy Maelen – Percussion
Dave Samuels – Vibraphone
George Young – Alto Sax (Solo)
Randy Brecker – Trumpet
Jon Faddis – Trumpet
David Taylor – Trombone
Wayne Andre – Trombone
George Marge – Tenor Sax
Romeo Penque – Baritone Sax
Gene Orloff – Strings Concertmaster
From the 1976 album "Circus Town".

Bomber
Tatsuro Yamashita – Electric Guitar & Percussion
Yutaka Uehara – Drums
Akihiro Tanaka – Bass
Kazuo Shiina – Electric Guitar (Solo)
Hiroyuki Namba – Keyboards
Minako Yoshida – Background Vocals
From the 1978 album "Go Ahead!", rock drill SE at the beginning is removed in this album.

Solid Slider
Tatsuro Yamashita – Electric Guitar
Yutaka Uehara – Drums
Akihiro Tanaka – Bass
Ryuichi Sakamoto – Keyboards
Kenji Ohmura – Electric Guitar (Solo)
Nobu Saito – Percussion
Minako Yoshida – Background Vocals
Koji Hatori – Trumpet
Shin Kazuhara – Trumpet
Shigeharu Mukai – Trombone
Tadanori Konakawa – Trombone
Takeru Muraoka – Tenor Sax
Shunzo Sunahara – Baritone Sax
From the 1977 album "Spacy".

Let's Dance Baby
Tatsuro Yamashita – Electric Guitar (Right), Percussion, Background Vocals & Bang!
Yutaka Uehara – Drums
Akihiro Tanaka – Bass
Kazuo Shiina – Electric Guitar (Left)
Hiroyuki Namba – Keyboards
Tomoo Okazaki – Alto Sax (Solo)
Minako Yoshida – Background Vocals
Ryuzo Kosugi – Background Vocals
From the album "Go Ahead!", also released as a single.

潮騒 –The Whispering Sea–
Tatsuro Yamashita – Electric Guitar (Solo), Percussion, Arp Bass, Percussion & Background Vocals
Yutaka Uehara – Drums
Hiroyuki Namba – Acoustic Piano
Ryuichi Sakamoto – Synthesizer
Chuei Yoshikawa – Acoustic Guitar
Minako Yoshida – Background Vocals
From the album "Go Ahead!".

Your Eyes
Tatsuro Yamashita – Electric Guitar, Electric Piano, Electric Sitar, Percussion & Background Vocals
Jun Aoyama – Drums
Koki Ito – Bass
Kazuo Shiina – Electric Guitar
Hiroyuki Namba – Keyboards
Hidefumi Toki – Alto Sax (Solo)
Chuei Yoshikawa – Acoustic Guitar
Tadaaki Ohno – Strings Concertmaster
Koji Hajima – Conductor
Strings arranged by Hiroki Inui
From the album "For You".

Love Space
Shuichi Murakami – Drums
Haruomi Hosono – Bass
Tsunehide Matsuki – Electric Guitar
Hiroshi Sato – Acoustic Piano
Nobu Saito – Percussion
Tomoo Okazaki – Alto Sax (Solo)
Minako Yoshida – Background Vocals
Tatsuro Yamashita – Background Vocals
Tadaaki Ohno – Strings Concertmaster
Hitoshi Yoshizawa – Conductor
From the album "Spacy".

Sparkle
Tatsuro Yamashita – Electric Guitar, Percussion & Background Vocals
Jun Aoyama – Drums
Koki Ito – Bass
Hiroyuki Namba – Keyboards
Hidefumi Toki – Alto Sax (Solo)
Minako Yoshida – Background Vocals
Shin Kazuhara – Trumpet
Masahiro Kobayashi – Trumpet
Shigeharu Mukai – Trombone
Tadanori Konakawa – Trombone
Takeru Muraoka – Tenor Sax
Shunzo Sunahara – Baritone Sax
From the album "For You".

Chart positions

Weekly charts

Year-end charts

Release history

Notes

References

Tatsuro Yamashita albums
1982 greatest hits albums